"Holly Rock" is a song written and produced by Prince and performed by Sheila E. who also received writing and production credits. The song appeared on the soundtrack of the 1985 film Krush Groove, with Sheila E. performing the song in the film. It is a high-energy rap number with Sheila E. rapping throughout most of the song. The song did not chart, but it became a fan favorite. The 7" single release was backed by "Toy Box", a track from Romance 1600.

Music video
A live performance of the song was used as the music video.

Background
"Holly Rock" is the sixth track (and only Prince-related track) on the movie [[Krush_Groove#Soundtrack|Krush Groove' soundtrack]].  It was released as the album's fifth single nine months after the album's release.

Basic tracking took place on  April 24, 1985, at Sunset Sound in  Hollywood, California  (the day after "Evolsidog" and four days before "All My Dreams" and "Kiss").

In 2019 the original Prince version of the song was released on the posthumous Prince album Originals.

Formats and track listings
U.S. 7"
 "Holly Rock" (edit) – 3:58
 "Toy Box – 5:32

U.S. 12" promo
 "Holly Rock" (extended version) – 6:35
 "Holly Rock" (7" single edit) – 3:58Originals'' release
 "Holly Rock" – 6:38
 "Holly Rock" (Music Video Edit) – 3:56
 "Holly Rock" (Edit) – 3:47

Charts

Weekly charts

Year-end charts

References

1986 singles
Sheila E. songs
Songs written by Sheila E.
1986 songs